Leftwich is an English surname. Notable people with the surname include:

Adrian Leftwich (1940–2013), South African anti-apartheid activist and academic
Benjamin Francis Leftwich (born 1989), English singer-songwriter
Brad Leftwich (born 1953), American fiddler and banjoist
Byron Leftwich (born 1980), American football player
Debbe Leftwich, American politician
Jabez Leftwich (1765–1855), American politician
Jim Leftwich (1944-2020), Australian Aboriginal bishop
Joel Leftwich
John Carter Leftwich, founder of Klondike, Alabama and educational leader
John W. Leftwich (1826–1870), American politician
Joseph Leftwich (1892–1983), English writer, poet, critic and translator
Keith Leftwich (1954–2003), American politician
Lloyd Leftwich, American politician
Phil Leftwich (born 1969), American baseball player
William G. Leftwich, Jr. (1931–1970), United States Marine Corps officer

English-language surnames
Surnames of English origin
English toponymic surnames